Philip Alfred Newman (born 24 August 1937) is a New Zealand cricketer. He played in two first-class matches for Central Districts in 1958/59.

See also
 List of Central Districts representative cricketers

References

External links
 

1937 births
Living people
New Zealand cricketers
Central Districts cricketers
Cricketers from Nelson, New Zealand